The Rady School of Management is the graduate business school of the University of California, San Diego, United States. It was established in 2001. It offers full-time and part-time Master of Business Administration (MBA) programs, a full-time Master of Finance degree, a full-time and part-time Master of Science in Business Analytics degree and a full-time Master of Professional Accountancy degree. In addition, the Rady School has a Ph.D. program, offers non-degree executive development programs, and undergraduate courses including minors in business, accounting, supply chain and entrepreneurship & innovation. The Rady School of Management is the second-youngest professional school at UC San Diego. 

The Rady School of Management was created due to a need expressed to the school's founders by the San Diego business community.

The Rady School's Mission Statement: The Rady School of Management advances business by generating meaningful research and educating principled, innovative leaders.

Master's programs

MBA

The Rady School offers the STEM designated MBA program in two formats, the FlexMBA and the Full-Time MBA. The FlexMBA program is offered part-time during the week (FlexEvening), or on weekends (FlexWeekend). The school works collaboratively with the business community and the UC San Diego campus.

Rady School Alumni

Rady School students and alumni have a significant impact on the innovation economy locally, nationally and globally. They have launched over 200 companies that are operational today. In a single year, Rady School alumni and students had a nearly $2 Billion impact on the economy through funding events, partnerships, revenue generation and an IPO. Alumni ‘intrapreneurs’ have launched over 100 products or services within their organizations.

Master of Finance
The Master of Finance degree program was introduced by the Rady School of Management in February 2014. The Master of Finance degree is STEM designated, one-year program.

Master of Science in Business Analytics

In July 2015, the Rady School announced it will offer a Master of Science in Business Analytics, with the first class matriculating in fall 2016. The Master of Science in Business Analytics (MSBA) program is STEM Designated.

The Rady School also offers a FlexWeekend MSBA. The same curriculum of the full-time MSBA program will be offered on alternating Saturdays-Sundays, and students can complete their degree in as little as 17 months.

Master of Professional Accountancy

The Rady School's STEM designated Master of Professional Accountancy (MPAc) prepares students for a wide range of accounting career opportunities that span public accounting firms, corporate accounting departments, and not-for-profit and governmental organizations.

Other Rady programs
Undergraduate

The Rady School offers undergraduate minors in business, accounting, entrepreneurship & innovation, and supply chain.

Ph.D.
The Rady School offers a Ph.D. program in management.

MBA/Ph.D.
The Rady School also offers a concurrent MBA degree for students pursuing a Ph.D. at the Scripps Institution of Oceanography.

Dean
On June 27, 2019, it was announced that Lisa Ordóñez would become the Rady School's second dean, following founding dean Robert S. Sullivan's stepping down. She began as the school's dean on September 1, 2019. Ordóñez is the school's first female dean. She joined the Rady School from the University of Arizona's Eller School of Management where she served as vice dean of academic programs.

Prior to Ordóñez’ appointment, founding dean Robert S. Sullivan, served as dean from January 1, 2003 until August 31, 2019. Prior to his arrival at UC San Diego, he served as dean of the Kenan-Flagler Business School at the University of North Carolina at Chapel Hill, and as dean of the Graduate School of Industrial Administration at Carnegie Mellon University.

Distinguished faculty
Rady School faculty were ranked 14th in faculty research in the world in 2015 by the Financial Times Global MBA Rankings. Bloomberg Businessweek ranked Rady School faculty 1st in Intellectual Capital in 2014.

Campus

Otterson Hall
Otterson Hall, designed by Ellerbe Becket in the postmodern style, opened in 2007. It was named in honor of the late William (Bill) Otterson, co-founder of UC San Diego CONNECT, in appreciation for his contributions to the San Diego business community and his impact on the region.

The facility comprises  of classrooms, offices and community space. The building provides views overlooking the Pacific Ocean and the Torrey Pines Gliderport. Otterson Hall is powered in part by a rooftop solar photovoltaic system.

Wells Fargo Hall

The school began construction in 2010 on a new 81,000 square foot building, Wells Fargo Hall, which was completed in May 2012. The five-story structure, which was designed by Charles Luckman & Associates connects with Otterson Hall and features large capacity classrooms, conference rooms, a behavioral lab and the 295-seat J.R. Beyster Auditorium. Wells Fargo Hall also features an outdoor space adjacent to the J.R. Beyster Auditorium named Sullivan Square, in honor of the school's founding dean Robert S. Sullivan. Wells Fargo Hall is LEED Gold certified.

Centers and institutes
The Beyster Institute
The Beyster Institute at the Rady School focuses on training, education and consulting in entrepreneurship and employee ownership. The Beyster Institute was established by Dr. J. Robert Beyster—founder of Science Applications International Corporation in 2002. It became a part of the Rady School in 2004.

The Brandes Center

The Brandes Center, created in 2022, investigates structural and behavioral factors in global markets with a focus on value investing and long-term thinking.

California Institute for Innovation and Development
The Rady School of Management is home to the California Institute for Innovation and Development (CIID). There are several programs within CIID:

 Rady Venture Fund: Rady MBA students have the opportunity to participate in the Rady Venture Fund, a student-assisted venture capital fund that provides a source of funding for local startup companies. Launched in 2010, the Rady Venture Fund teaches graduate students about venture finance, investment analysis and fund management.
 StartR: Founded in 2013, StartR is a non-profit business accelerator designed to propel the success of companies founded by Rady School and UC San Diego students and alumni. StartR is a free, six month-long program that provides startup teams with mentoring, workshops, seminars, work space, consultation with Rady School faculty and industry experts, connections to funding sources and a conduit to the larger San Diego business community.

Center for Business Analytics

The Center for Business Analytics serves as a catalyst for research, education and innovation in the use of analytics and big data.
Center for Social Innovation and Impact
The Center for Social Innovation and Impact was established with assistance from Carol Lazier and Family, whose $1 million endowment supported the launch of the center.

Institute for Supply Chain Excellence and Innovation

The Institute for Supply Chain Excellence and Innovation is focused on talent development, innovation, and practices and methods to drive an efficient supply chain.

Kroner Center for Financial Research

The Kroner Center for Financial Research was created in 2019 to support research on questions related to institutional investing.

U.S. - Israel Center on Innovation and Economic Sustainability 
The U.S. – Israel Center on Innovation and Economic Sustainability was founded in 2012 to connect industry leaders, entrepreneurs and community supporters from around the world to work collaboratively on issues of innovation and growth.

Rankings
The Full-Time, FlexEvening (Part-Time), FlexWeekend (EMBA) MBA programs, MFin and MSBA program at the Rady School have been ranked by U.S. and international publications.

Recent Rady School Rankings

4th in the US: Best B-Schools for Entrepreneurship (Bloomberg Businessweek MBA rankings 2022-23)
4th in the US: Best B-Schools for Learning (Bloomberg Businessweek MBA rankings 2022-23)
9th in the US & 12th Globally for Faculty Quality: Full-Time MBA ranking 2021 (Economist)
10th in the US: Master’s in Business Analytics (QS Business Masters rankings 2020)
28th globally & 23rd in the US for Faculty Research: Full-Time MBA ranking 2020 (Financial Times)
28th in the US: Best Part-Time MBA program (US News & World Report Best Business Schools 2022)
30th in the US: Recognized by peer B-School Deans and MBA program directors for MBA specialty in Entrepreneurship (US News & World Report 2022)

References

External links
 Rady School of Management

Rady family
Business schools in California
Universities and colleges in San Diego
University of California, San Diego
Educational institutions established in 2001
2001 establishments in California